Providence was launched in 1790 at South Shields. She initially traded with Saint Petersburg but then in 1804 the British Royal Navy hired her. She remained in Royal Navy service until towards the end of 1812. She returned to trading as a transport, coaster, and to the Baltic. She disappears from the registers between 1835 and 1850. She was wrecked in 1869 and broken up in 1870.

Merchantman
Providence appeared in Lloyd's Register (LR) in 1792 with Hutchinson, master and owner, and trade Petersburg–London.

Hired armed ship
The Royal Navy hired Providence on 16 May 1804. Her captain was Commander Peter Rye.

On 14 September Providence captured the Prussian vessel Louisa Ulrica.

She was carrying 1000 stands of arms, two 12-pounder field pieces, two mortars, uniforms for 1000 men, tents, and the like. She was also carrying M. Jean Saint-Faust who was traveling to Curaçao to assume command of the naval forces of the Batavian Republic.

On 28 May, Lloyd's List (LL) it reported that the armed ships Providence, Ranger, and  had arrived at Elsinore on 14 May with their convoy.

In late February 1806, Providence was at Cuxhaven, having brought a convoy to the Elbe. In a gale the pilot ran her aground on the island of Pogen during a neap tide; the next high tide was four feet lower. She remained aground for five weeks. during this time the crew worked to lighten her. They put all her stores and provisions in the Danish government's storehouses at Gluckstadt. Rye had the crew dig her anchor and keel free, enabling them to repair her caulking. Finally, on 6 April, in the evening, after more digging, Providence floated free. She returned to Cuxhaven, where the senior British naval officer, ordered her out of the Elbe to return to Grimsby to avoid any risk of her being detained and her crew made prisoners.  

On 1 July 1808 Providence detained and sent into Grimsby Vrow Maria Catharina, Visser, master.

Later, in September 1808, Rye fought off five Danish gunboats in light winds off Jutland. In October Providence escorted a convoy to Karlskrona. This was Rye's only passage through the Belt into the Baltic.

Commander Peter Rye attained post rank on 12 August 1812, but he was on convoy duty. Providence reached the Little Nore on 14 August. On 21 September he made his last entry in her log and he decommissioned her. During his time as her commander he had made 34 voyages to the North Sea and back, and had sailed 40,000 miles. Providences contract with the Navy ended on 23 September 1812.

Merchantman
Providence apparently was not listed in LR between the end of her contract with the Royal Navy and reappearance in 1820. She was listed in the Register of Shipping (RS) from 1813 on.

Fate
Providence was wrecked on 13 February 1869 on Corton Sands, near Great Yarmouth. Her entry was closed on the Register on 31 March 1870 with the notation "condemned & broken up at North Shields". This suggests that Providence had been refloated and brought back to Shields for breaking up. Her listing in Lloyd's Register for 1869 carried the annotation "broken up".

Notes

Citations

References
 
 

1790 ships
Age of Sail merchant ships of England
Hired armed vessels of the Royal Navy
Maritime incidents in February 1869